Muthuservamadam is a village in the Udayarpalayam taluk of Ariyalur district, Tamil Nadu, India.

Demographics 

As per the 2001 census, Muthuservamadam had a total population of 4528 with 2239 males and 2289 females.

References 

Villages in Ariyalur district